Part 2 is the debut studio album by Brix & the Extricated, released on 22 September 2017 on Blang Records.

The album was made available on  black or clear vinyl, CD and download. A video for the track "Damned For Eternity" was filmed by the documentary maker Dan Edelstyn.

Critical reception

It was released to critical acclaim, awarded 9/10 by Marc Burrows of Drowned in Sound, who, acknowledging that three of the band are ex-Fall members, wrote "the new songs are what really impress, glowing with a sparky freshness few saw coming. Groups made from former members of another band aren’t meant to transcend the nostalgia circuit." It was also favourably reviewed by Uncut and Q.

Track listing
All songs written by Brix & the Extricated / Brix Smith
"Pneumatic Violet" 
"Feeling Numb"
"Something to Lose"
"Hotel Blöedel"
"Damned for Eternity"
"Moonrise Kingdom"
"Teflon"
"Valentino"
"LA"
"Time Tunnel"
"Hollywood"

Special Edition (CD)
"Pneumatic Violet" 
"Feeling Numb"
"Something to Lose"
"Hotel Bloedel"
"Damned for Eternity"
"Moonrise Kingdom"
"Teflon"
"Valentino"
"LA"
"Time Tunnel"
"Hollywood"
"Faced With Time"
"US 80's 90's (live)"
"Temporary Insanity"
"Moonrise Kingdom (Harmonic Convergence)"

Special Edition (DVD)
"Uncaged"

Personnel
Brix & the Extricated
Brix Smith Start - vocals, guitar
Steve Hanley - bass guitar
Paul Hanley - drums
Steve Trafford - guitar, vocals
Jason Brown - guitar

References

2017 debut albums
Brix & the Extricated albums